NGC 2857 (also known as Arp 1 and PGC 26666) is a spiral galaxy in the constellation Ursa Major.  It was discovered on January 9, 1856, by R. J. Mitchell.

NGC 2857 is the first object in Halton Arp's Atlas of Peculiar Galaxies, and one of six Arp objects in the 'Low Surface Brightness Galaxies' section. The other five low surface brightness galaxies are Arp 2 (UGC 10310), Arp 3, Arp 4, Arp 5 (NGC 3664), and Arp 6 (NGC 2537).

On October 10, 2012, supernova SN 2012fg was observed in NGC 2857 by the MASTER-Kislovodsk auto-detection system. Its absolute magnitude was calculated to be -19.8. The spectrum of SN 2012fg was recorded and analyzed by multiple teams of scientists as it changed rapidly in the days following its detection.

References

External links 
 
 Full Arp Atlas
 Halton Arp's image of Arp 1
 Constellation Locator
 SIMBAD Astronomical Database
 NASA/IPAC Extragalactic Database
 SN 2012fg detection announcement

001
Unbarred spiral galaxies
Low surface brightness galaxies
26666
2857
05000
Peculiar galaxies
Ursa Major (constellation)